Enoc or ENOC may refer to:

 ENOC, Emirates National Oil Company
 European Network of Ombudspersons for Children (abbreviated ENOC)
 Saint Issel, the father of Saint Teilo whose name is also given as Enoc
 Enoc Huws, 1891 Welsh novel by Daniel Owen
 EnerNOC, American utilities company, NASDAQ code ENOC
 ENOC (album), a 2020 album by Ozuna

See also
Enoch (disambiguation)